The discography of Soraya, who was a Colombian-American Latin pop singer-songwriter, consists of five studio albums and four compilation albums. Soraya has also released fifteen singles and twelve music videos.

Her first album, En Esta Noche/On Nights Like This, was released in 1996 by Universal Music, and was successful across Latin America, the United States and in Germany. Two more albums Torre de Marfil/Wall of Smiles and Cuerpo y Alma/I'm Yours were released by the same label over the next four years.

In 2000 Soraya was diagnosed with breast cancer and took time off from her career to fight the disease. Having seemingly recovered, she moved to EMI Music in 2002 and released Soraya the following year. Her fifth and final studio album El Otro Lado de Mi was released in 2005, by which point her cancer had returned, and Soraya died in May 2006.

Albums

Studio albums

Compilation albums

Singles

As lead artist

Promotional singles

Videography

Footnotes

References

Discographies of Colombian artists
Latin pop music discographies
Discography